Bōeki Center Station (貿易センター駅, Bōeki-Sentā-eki) is a railway station in Hyōgo Prefecture.  It is located on the Port Liner in Chūō-ku, Kobe, Japan.  Bōeki literally means trade in English. It is the only other station other than Sannomiya and Port Terminal to be on Honshu (Japan's main Island).

Stations next to Boeki Center
Portliner
Local (普通)
Sannomiya (P01) - Boeki Center (P02) - Port Terminal (P03)

Railway stations in Kobe